The 2012–13 Oregon Ducks men's basketball team represented the University of Oregon during the 2012–13 NCAA Division I men's basketball season. The Ducks, led by their third year head coach Dana Altman, were members of the Pac-12 Conference and played their home games at Matthew Knight Arena. They finished with a record of 28–9 overall, 12–6 in Pac-12 play  to finish in a three-way tie for second place. They were champions of the Pac-12 tournament, defeating UCLA in the championship game, to earn an automatic bid to the 2013 NCAA tournament where they defeated Oklahoma State in the second round and Saint Louis in the third round to advance to the Sweet Sixteen where they lost to Louisville.

Recruits
Source:

Roster

Depth chart

Schedule
 
|-
!colspan=9| Exhibition

|-
!colspan=9| Regular season

|-
!colspan=6 style="background:#004F27; color:yellow;"| Pac-12 tournament

|-
!colspan=6 style="background:#004F27; color:yellow;"| NCAA tournament

Notes
On March 12, 2013 Dana Altman was named the John R. Wooden Pac-12 head coach of the year.

References

Oregon Ducks men's basketball seasons
Oregon
Oregon
Oregon Ducks men's baske
Oregon Ducks men's baske
Pac-12 Conference men's basketball tournament championship seasons